Commuter rail, or suburban rail, is a passenger rail transport service that primarily operates within a metropolitan area, connecting commuters to a central city from adjacent suburbs or commuter towns. Commuter rail systems are considered heavy rail, using electrified or diesel trains. Distance charges or zone pricing may be used.

The term can refer to systems with a wide variety of different features and service frequencies, but is often used in contrast to rapid transit or light rail.

Some services share similarities with both commuter rail and high-frequency rapid transit, examples being the German S-Bahn in some cities, the Réseau Express Régional (RER) in Paris, the S Lines in Milan, many Japanese commuter systems, the East Rail line in Hong Kong and some Australasian suburban networks, such as Sydney Trains. Some services, like British commuter rail, share tracks with other passenger services and freight.

In the United States, commuter rail often refers to services that operate a higher frequency during peak periods and a lower frequency off-peak. Since the creation of Toronto's GO Transit commuter service in 1967, commuter rail services and route length have been expanding in North America. In the US, commuter rail is sometimes referred to as regional rail.

Characteristics

Most commuter (or suburban) trains are built to main line rail standards, differing from light rail or rapid transit (metro rail) systems by:
being larger
providing more seating and less standing room, owing to the longer distances involved
having (in most cases) a lower frequency of service
having scheduled services (i.e. trains run at specific times rather than at specific intervals)
serving lower-density suburban areas, typically connecting suburbs to the city center
sharing track or right-of-way with intercity and/or freight trains
not fully grade separated (containing at-grade crossings with crossing gates)
being able to skip certain stations as an express service due to normally being driver controlled

Train schedule
Compared to rapid transit (or metro rail), commuter/suburban rail often has lower frequency, following a schedule rather than fixed intervals, and fewer stations spaced further apart. They primarily serve lower density suburban areas (non inner-city), generally only having one or two stops in a city's central business district, and often share right-of-way with intercity or freight trains.  Some services operate only during peak hours and others uses fewer departures during off peak hours and weekends. Average speeds are high, often 50 km/h (30 mph) or higher. These higher speeds better serve the longer distances involved. Some services include express services which skip some stations in order to run faster and separate longer distance riders from short-distance ones.

The general range of commuter trains' travel distance varies between 15 and 200 km (10 and 125 miles), but longer distances can be covered when the trains run between two or several cities (e.g. S-Bahn in the Ruhr area of Germany). Distances between stations may vary, but are usually much longer than those of urban rail systems. In city centers the train either has a terminal station or passes through the city centre with notably fewer station stops than those of urban rail systems. Toilets are often available on-board trains and in stations.

Track
Their ability to coexist with freight or intercity services in the same right-of-way can drastically reduce system construction costs. However, frequently they are built with dedicated tracks within that right-of-way to prevent delays, especially where service densities have converged in the inner parts of the network.

Most such trains run on the local standard gauge track. Some systems may run on a narrower or broader gauge. Examples of narrow gauge systems are found in Japan, Indonesia, Malaysia, Thailand, Taiwan, Switzerland, in the Brisbane (Queensland Rail's City network) and Perth (Transperth) systems in Australia, in some systems in Sweden, and on the Genoa-Casella line in Italy. Some countries and regions, including Finland, India, Pakistan, Russia, Brazil and Sri Lanka, as well as San Francisco (BART) in the US and Melbourne and Adelaide in Australia, use broad gauge track.

Distinction between other modes of rail

Metro
Metro rail and rapid transit usually cover smaller inner-urban areas within  of city centers, run more frequently, and use dedicated tracks (underground or elevated), whereas commuter rail often shares tracks, technology and the legal framework within mainline railway systems.

However, the classification as a metro or rapid rail can be difficult as both may typically cover a metropolitan area exclusively, run on separate tracks in the centre, and often feature purpose-built rolling stock. The fact that the terminology is not standardised across countries (even across English-speaking countries) further complicates matters. This distinction is most easily made when there are two (or more) systems such as New York's subway and the LIRR and Metro-North Railroad, Paris' Métro and RER along with Transilien, Washington D.C.'s Metro along with its MARC and VRE, London's tube lines of the Underground and the Overground, Elizabeth line, Thameslink along with other commuter rail operators, Madrid's Metro and Cercanías, Barcelona's Metro and Rodalies, and Tokyo's subway and the JR lines along with various privately owned and operated commuter rail systems.

Regional rail
Regional rail usually provides rail services between towns and cities, rather than purely linking major population hubs in the way inter-city rail does. Regional rail operates outside major cities. Unlike Inter-city, it stops at most or all stations between cities. It provides a service between smaller communities along the line that are often byproducts of ribbon developments, and also connects with long-distance services at interchange stations located at junctions, terminals, or larger towns along the line. Alternative names are "local train" or "stopping train". Examples include the former BR's Regional Railways, France's TER (Transport express régional), Germany's Regionalexpress and Regionalbahn, and South Korea's Tonggeun services.

Inter-city rail

In some European countries, the distinction between commuter trains and long-distance/intercity trains is subtle, due to the relatively short distances involved. For example, so-called "intercity" trains in Belgium and the Netherlands carry many commuters, while their equipment, range, and speeds are similar to those of commuter trains in some larger countries. In the United Kingdom, there is no division of organisation or branding between commuter, regional, and inter-city trains, providing no obvious means for their categorization.

Russian commuter trains, on the other hand, frequently cover areas larger than Belgium itself, although these are still short distances by Russian standards. They have a different ticketing system from long-distance trains, and in major cities they often operate from a separate section of the train station.

Some consider "inter-city" service to be that which operates as an express service between two main city stations, bypassing intermediate stations. However, this term is used in Australia (Sydney for example) to describe the regional trains operating beyond the boundaries of the suburban services, even though some of these "inter-city" services stop all stations similar to German regional services. In this regard, the German service delineations and naming conventions are clearer and better used for academic purposes.

High-speed rail

Sometimes high-speed rail can serve daily use of commuters. To meet the demand of commuters, JR sells commuter discount passes. Before 2021, they operated 16-car bilevel E4 Series Shinkansen trains at rush hour, providing a capacity of 1,600 seats. Several lines in China, such as the Beijing–Tianjin Intercity Railway and the Shanghai–Nanjing High-Speed Railway, serve a similar role with many more under construction or planned.

In South Korea, some sections of the high-speed rail network are also heavily used by commuters, such as the section between Gwangmyeong Station and Seoul Station on the KTX network (Gyeongbu HSR Line), or the section between Dongtan Station and Suseo station on the SRT Line. 

The high-speed services linking Zürich, Bern and Basel in Switzerland have brought the Central Business Districts (CBDs) of these three cities within 1 hour of each other. This has resulted in unexpectedly high demand for new commuter trips between the three cities and a corresponding increase in suburban rail passengers accessing the high-speed services at the main city-centre stations (Hauptbahnhof).

The regional trains Stockholm–Uppsala, Stockholm–Västerås, Stockholm–Eskilstuna and Gothenburg–Trollhättan in Sweden reach  and have many daily commuters.

In Great Britain, the HS1 domestic services between London and Ashford runs at a top speed of 225 km/h, and in peak hours the trains can be full with commuters standing. 

The Athens Suburban Railway in Greece consists of five lines, 4 of which are electrified. The Athens–Chalcis line is also expected to attain speeds of up to  upon upgrading of the SKA–Oinoi railway sector. These lines also have many daily commuters, with the number expected to rise even higher upon full completion of the Acharnes Railway Center.

Eskişehir-Ankara and Konya-Ankara high speed train routes serve as high speed commuter trains in Turkey.

Train types
Commuter/suburban trains are usually optimized for maximum passenger volume, in most cases without sacrificing too much comfort and luggage space, though they seldom have all the amenities of long-distance trains. Cars may be single- or double-level, and aim to provide seating for all. Compared to intercity trains, they have less space, fewer amenities and limited baggage areas.

Multiple unit type
Commuter rail trains are usually composed of multiple units, which are self-propelled, bidirectional, articulated passenger rail cars with driving motors on each (or every other) bogie. Depending on local circumstances and tradition they may be powered either by diesel engines located below the passenger compartment (diesel multiple units) or by electricity picked up from third rails or overhead lines (electric multiple units). Multiple units are almost invariably equipped with control cabs at both ends, which is why such units are so frequently used to provide commuter services, due to the associated short turn-around time.

Locomotive hauled services

Locomotive hauled services are used in some countries or locations. This is often a case of asset sweating, by using a single large combined fleet for intercity and regional services. Loco hauled services are usually run in push-pull formation, that is, the train can run with the locomotive at the "front" or "rear" of the train (pushing or pulling). Trains are often equipped with a control cab at the other end of the train from the locomotive, allowing the train operator to operate the train from either end. The motive power for locomotive-hauled commuter trains may be either electric or diesel-electric, although some countries, such as Germany and some of the former Soviet-bloc countries, also use diesel-hydraulic locomotives.

Seat plans
In the US and some other countries, a three-and-two seat plan is used. However, few people sit in the middle seat on these trains because they feel crowded and uncomfortable.

In Japan, South Korea and Indonesia, longitudinal (sideways window-lining) seating is widely used in many commuter rail trains to increase capacity in rush hours. Carriages are usually not organized to increase seating capacity (although in some trains at least one carriage would feature more doors to facilitate easier boarding and alighting and bench seats so that they can be folded up during rush hour to provide more standing room) even in the case of commuting longer than 50 km and commuters in the Greater Tokyo Area, Seoul metropolitan area, and Jabodetabek area have to stand in the train for more than an hour.

Commuter rail systems around the world

Africa

Currently there are not many examples of commuter rail in Africa. Metrorail operates in the major cities of South Africa, and there are some commuter rail services in Algeria, Botswana, Kenya, Morocco, Egypt and Tunisia.
In Algeria, SNTF operates commuter rail lines between the capital Algiers and its southern and eastern suburbs. They also serve to connect Algiers' main universities to each other. The Dar es Salaam commuter rail offers intracity services in Dar es Salaam, Tanzania. In Botswana, the (Botswana Railways) "BR Express" has a commuter train between Lobatse and Gaborone.

Asia

East Asia

In Japan, commuter rail systems have extensive network and frequent service and are heavily used. In many cases, Japanese commuter rail is operationally more like a typical metro system (frequent trains, an emphasis on standing passengers, short station spacings) than it is like commuter rail in other countries. Japanese commuter rail commonly interline with city center subway lines, with commuter rail trains continuing into the subway network, and then out onto different commuter rail systems on the other side of the city. Many Japanese commuter systems operate various stopping patterns to reduce the travel time to distant locations, often using station passing loops instead of dedicated express tracks. It is notable that the larger Japanese commuter rail systems are owned and operated by for-profit private railway companies, without public subsidy.

East Japan Railway Company operates a large suburban train network in Tokyo with various lines connecting the suburban areas to the city center. While the Yamanote Line, Keihin Tohoku Line, Chūō–Sōbu Line services arguably are more akin to rapid transit with frequent stops, simple stopping patterns (relative to other JR East lines) no branching services and largely serving the inner suburbs; other services along the Chūō Rapid Line, Sōbu Rapid Line/Yokosuka Line, Ueno–Tokyo Line, Shōnan–Shinjuku Line etc. are mid-distance services from suburban lines in the outer reaches of Greater Tokyo through operating into these lines to form a high frequency corridor though central Tokyo.

Other commuter rail routes in Japan include:
 Hanshin Namba Line and Kintetsu Namba Line have a busy east west underground section that allow trains from both Hanshin Electric Railway and Kintetsu Railway to access Namba, a major commercial center of Osaka, and service destinations east and west of Osaka.
 Osaka Metro Sakaisuji Line is a north south line that allows Hankyu services from the Senri Line, Kyoto Main Line and Arashiyama Line to enter Osaka city center.
 JR West Tozai Line is an underground east west corridor allowing trains from the Kobe Line, Takarazuka Line and Gakkentoshi Line to access Umeda in central Osaka.
JR West Osaka Loop Line is a mostly elevated loop line that allows for services from the Yamatoji Line, Hanwa Line and Sakurajima Line to loop around central Osaka.
JR West Kobe Line/Kyoto Line is a four track corridor allowing Biwako Line, Kosei Line, Takarazuka Line, San'yō Main Line and Akō Line services to service Kyoto, Osaka and Kobe.
A special private railway Kōbe Rapid Transit Railway owns two underground corridors (a north south and east west line) that allow for Sanyo Electric Railway, Hankyu railway, Hanshin Electric Railway and Kobe Electric Railway services to enter and cross Kobe city center.
 Most of the trains on the Meitetsu network through operate into a high frequency trunk line on the Meitetsu Nagoya Main Line branching out to other lines on the other side of Nagoya.

Commuter rail systems have been inaugurated in several cities in China such as Beijing, Shanghai, Zhengzhou, Wuhan, Changsha and the Pearl River Delta. With plans for large systems in northeastern Zhejiang, Jingjinji, and Yangtze River Delta areas. The level of service varies considerably from line to line ranging high to near high speeds. More developed and established lines such as the Guangshen Railway have more frequent metro-like service. 

The two MTR lines which are owned and formerly operated by the Kowloon-Canton Railway Corporation (East Rail line and Tuen Ma line which is integrated from the former West Rail line and Ma On Shan line in 2021), then the "KCR"), and MTR's own Tung Chung line connect the new towns in New Territories and the city centre Kowloon together with frequent intervals, and some New Territories-bound trains terminate at intermediate stations, providing more frequent services in Kowloon and the towns closer to Kowloon. Most of the sections of these four lines are overground and some sections of the East Rail Line share tracks with intercity trains to mainland China. The three KCR lines are integrated into the MTR network since 2008 and most passengers do not need to exit and re-enter the system through separate fare gates and purchase separate tickets to transfer between such lines and the rest of the network (the exceptions are between the Tuen Ma line's East Tsim Sha Tsui station and the Tsuen Wan line's Tsim Sha Tsui station.

In Taiwan, the Western line in the Taipei-Taoyuan Metropolitan Area, Taichung Metropolitan Area and Tainan-Kaohsiung Metropolitan Area as well as the Neiwan-Liujia line in the Hsinchu Area are considered commuter rail.

In South Korea, the Seoul Metropolitan Subway includes a total of 22 lines, and some of its lines are suburban lines. This is especially the case for lines operated by Korail, such as the Gyeongui-Jungang Line, the Gyeongchun Line, the Suin-Bundang Line, or the Gyeonggang Line. Even some lines not operated by Korail, such as the AREX Line, the Seohae Line or the Shinbundang Line mostly function as commuter rail. Lastly, even for the "numbered lines" (1-9) of the Seoul Metropolitan Subway which mostly travel in the dense parts of Seoul, some track sections extend far outside of the city, and operate large sections at ground level, such as on the Line 1, Line 3 and Line 4. In Busan, the Donghae Line, while part of the Busan Metro system, mostly functions as a commuter rail line.

Southeast Asia

In Indonesia, the KRL Commuterline is the largest commuter rail system in the country, serving the Greater Jakarta. It connects the Jakarta city center with surrounding cities and sub-urbans in Banten and West Java provinces, including Depok, Bogor, Tangerang,  Serpong, Rangkasbitung, Bekasi and Cikarang. In July 2015, KA Commuter Jabodetabek served more than 850,000 passengers per day, which is almost triple of the 2011 figures, but still less than 3.5% of all Jabodetabek commutes. Other commuter rail systems in Indonesia include the Metro Surabaya Commuter Line, Prambanan Express, KRL Commuterline Yogyakarta–Solo, Kedung Sepur, and the Greater Bandung Commuter.

In the Philippines, the Philippine National Railways has two commuter rail systems currently operational; the PNR Metro Commuter Line in the Greater Manila Area and the PNR Bicol Commuter in the Bicol Region. A new commuter rail line in Metro Manila, the North–South Commuter Railway, is currently under construction. Its North section is set to be partially opened by 2021.

In Malaysia, there are two commuter services operated by Keretapi Tanah Melayu. They are the KTM Komuter that serves Kuala Lumpur and the surrounding Klang Valley area, and the KTM Komuter Northern Sector that serves Greater Penang, Perak, Kedah and Perlis in the northern region of Peninsular Malaysia.

In Thailand, the Greater Bangkok Commuter rail and the Airport Rail Link serve the Bangkok Metropolitan Region. The SRT Red Lines, a new commuter line in Bangkok, started construction in 2009. It opened in 2021.

Another commuter rail system in Southeast Asia is the Yangon Circular Railway in Myanmar.

South Asia

In India, commuter rail systems are present in major cities. Mumbai Suburban Railway, the oldest suburban rail system in Asia, carries more than 7.24 million commuters on a daily basis which constitutes more than half of the total daily passenger capacity of the Indian Railways itself. Kolkata Suburban Railway is the biggest Suburban Railway network in India covering 348 stations carries more than 3.5 million commuters per day. The Chennai Suburban Railway along with MRTS is another railway of comparison where more than 2.5 million people travel daily to different areas in Chennai. Other commuter railways in India include Hyderabad MMTS, Delhi Suburban Railway, Pune Suburban Railway and Lucknow-Kanpur Suburban Railway.

In 2020, Government of India approved Bengaluru Commuter Rail to connect Bengaluru and its suburbs. It will be unique and first of its kind in India as it will have metro like facilities and rolling stock.

Karachi in Pakistan has had a circular railway since 1969. Also, in Bangladesh, there are several commuter rail systems.

West Asia 
In Iran, SYSTRA proposed 4 express lines similar to RER suburban lines in Paris. Tehran Metro is going to construct express lines. For instance, the Rahyab Behineh, a consultant for Tehran Metro, is studying Tehran Express Line 2. Tehran Metro currently has a commuter line, which is Line 5 between Tehran and Karaj. Isfahan has two lines to its suburbs Baharestan and Fuladshahr under construction, and a third line to Shahinshahr is planned.

In Turkey; Başkentray, İZBAN, Marmaray and Gaziray are well-known examples.

Europe

Major metropolitan areas in most European countries are usually served by extensive commuter/suburban rail systems. Well-known examples include BG Voz in Belgrade (Serbia), S-Bahn in Germany, Austria and German-speaking areas of Switzerland, Proastiakos in Greece, RER in France and Belgium, Servizio ferroviario suburbano in Italy, Cercanías and Rodalies (Catalonia) in Spain, CP Urban Services in Portugal, Esko in Prague and Ostrava (Czech Republic), HÉV in Budapest (Hungary) and DART in Dublin (Ireland).

London has multiple commuter rail routes:
 Thameslink brings together several branches from northern and southern suburbs and satellite towns in to a high frequency central tunnel underneath London.
 The London Overground, by contrast, skirts through the inner suburbs with lines mostly independent of each other, although there are several branches. The Watford DC line, partly shared with underground trains, uses third rail, but parallels a main line using overhead wires. The East London Line and North London Line run at metro-like frequencies in inner London, which make them nearly indistinguishable from metro systems apart from the fact that the tracks are shared with freight trains.
 The Metropolitan line, despite being part of the London Underground, is a commuter rail route as it links the City of London to commuter towns outside Greater London such as Rickmansworth, Amersham and Chesham, where it runs to a timetable, being the only London Underground line with a public timetable published. It also shares tracks with Chiltern Railways main line services between London and Aylesbury.

The Merseyrail network in Liverpool consists of two commuter rail routes powered by third rail, both of which branch out at one end. At the other, the Northern Line continues out of the city centre to a mainline rail interchange, while the Wirral Line has a city-centre loop.

Birmingham has four suburban routes, one of which is operated with diesel trains.

The Tyneside Electrics system in Newcastle existed from 1904 to 1967 using DC third rail. British Rail did not have the budget to maintain the ageing electrification system. The Riverside Branch was closed, while the remaining lines were de-electrified. 13 years later, they were re-electrified using DC overhead wires, and now form the Tyne & Wear Metro Yellow Line.

Many of the rail services around Glasgow are branded as Strathclyde Partnership for Transport. The network includes most electrified Scottish rail routes.

The Metro run eleven services which feed into Leeds, connecting the city with commuter areas and neighbouring urban centres in the West Yorkshire Connurbation.

MetroWest is a proposed network in Bristol, northern Somerset & southern Gloucestershire. The four-tracking of the line between Bristol Temple Meads and Bristol Parkway stations will enable local rail services to be separated from long-distance trains.

The Réseau express régional d'Île-de-France (RER) is a commuter rail network in the agglomeration of Paris. In the centre the RER has high frequency underground corridors where several suburban branches feed similar to a rapid transit system.

Commuter rail systems in Germany are called S-Bahn. While in some major cities S-Bahn services run on separate lines exclusively other systems use the existing regional rail tracks.

Randstadspoor is a network of Sprinter train services in and around the city of Utrecht in the Netherlands. For the realisation of this network, new stations were opened. Separate tracks have been built for these trains, so they can call frequently without disturbing high-frequent Intercity services parallel to these routes. Similar systems are planned for The Hague and Rotterdam.

In Sweden, electrified commuter rail systems known as Pendeltåg are present in the cities of Stockholm and Gothenburg. The Stockholm commuter rail system, which began in 1968, shares railway tracks with inter-city trains and freight trains, but for the most part runs on its own dedicated tracks. It is primarily used to transport passengers from nearby towns and other suburban areas into the city centre, not for transportation inside the city centre. The Gothenburg commuter rail system, which began in 1960, is similar to the Stockholm system, but does fully share tracks with long-distance trains.

In Norway, the Oslo commuter rail system mostly shares tracks with more long-distance trains, but also runs on some local railways without other traffic. Services converge on a primary main line between Asker and Lillestrøm. Oslo has the largest commuter rail system in the Nordic countries in terms of line lengths and number of stations. But some lines have travel times (over an hour from Oslo) and frequencies (once per hour) which are more like regional trains. Also Bergen, Stavanger and Trondheim have commuter rail systems. These have only one or two lines each and they share tracks with other trains.

In Finland, the Helsinki commuter rail network runs on dedicated tracks from Helsinki Central railway station to Leppävaara and Kerava. The Ring Rail Line serves Helsinki Airport and northern suburbs of Vantaa and is exclusively used by the commuter rail network. On 15 December 2019 Tampere got its own commuter rail service.

In Spain Cercanías networks exist in Madrid, Sevilla, Murcia/Alicante, San Sebastián, Cádiz, Valencia, Asturias, Santander, Zaragoza, Bilbao and Málaga. All these systems include underground sections in the city centre. There is also a network of narrow-gauge commuter systems in North Spain and Murcia.

In the autonomous community of Catalonia, and unlike the rest of Spain, the commuter service is not managed by Renfe Operadora. Since 2010, the Government of Catalonia has managed all the regular commuter services with the "transfer of Rodalies". There are two companies that manage the Catalan commuter network:

 Rodalies de Catalunya, which after the transfer at the beginning of 2010 when, due to the "Catalan rail chaos" of 2007, the Spanish government promised to transfer the Renfe commuter service to the Generalitat, although it does not deal with the entire service; After the transfer, responsibilities for the commuter trains were divided into three parts: the Generalitat (management, regulation, planning, coordination and inspection of services and activities and power to charge), Renfe (train operator and its maintenance), and Adif (owner of the railway infrastructure). Lines R1, R2, R2 Nord, R2 Sud, R3 (to Sant Quirze de Besora, from there to Puigcerdà or La Tor de Querol it is considered a regional route), R4, R7 and R8 run through Rodalies de Catalunya, all on Iberian gauge (1668 mm).

 Ferrocarrils de la Generalitat de Catalunya (or FGC) is the railway company responsible for the Vallès, Llobregat-Anoia and Lleida-La Pobla de Segur lines. This company is mainly in charge of metro and suburban lines, although it also has five commuter lines spread over two lines, four on the Llobregat-Anoia line (R5, R50, R6, R60) on metre-gauge (1000 mm) and a single line on the Lleida-La Pobla de Segur line (RL1) on Iberian gauge (1668 mm). FGC is in charge of the entire service, unlike Rodalies de Catalunya, which is not in charge of either the trains or the infrastructure. 
The Government of Catalonia will assume full control of the current R12 regional line in 2024 and it will be owned by the FGC. It will eliminate the current line and replace it with the new commuter lines RL3 and RL4, towards Cervera and Manresa from Lleida respectively.

In Italy there are several commuter rail networks:
Milan suburban railway service, operated by Trenord, has numerous services funneling into the underground Milan Passante railway.
Turin metropolitan railway service, operated by Trenitalia and GTT, with an underground railway line running through the city used by most services.
Naples Metro Line 2 is an underground corridor where commuter rail services operated by Trenitalia traverse and service the urban center. 
Bologna metropolitan railway service. The system comprises 8 lines.
Bari metropolitan railway service

In Poland, commuter rail systems exist in Tricity, Warsaw, Kraków (SKA) and Katowice (SKR). There is also a similar system planned in Wrocław and Szczecin. The terms used are "Szybka Kolej Miejska" (fast urban rail) and "kolej aglomeracyjna" (agglomeration rail). These systems are:
 Szybka Kolej Miejska w Warszawie in the Warsaw urban area, with 4 lines and 46 stations.
 Łódzka Kolej Aglomeracyjna is located in the center of Poland connecting satellite towns in and around Łódź. It also operates some trains between Łódź and Warsaw.
Szybka Kolej Miejska w Trójmieście is located in the Tricity/Trójmiasto urban area, the three cities of Gdańsk, Gdynia and Sopot.

The Proastiakos ("suburban") is Greece's suburban railway (commuter rail) services, which are run by TrainOSE, on infrastructure owned by the Hellenic Railways Organisation (OSE). There are three Proastiakos networks, servicing the country's three largest cities: Athens, Thessaloniki and Patras. In particular, the Athenian network is undergoing modifications to completely separate it from mainline traffic, by re-routing the tracks via a tunnel underneath the city center. A similar project is planned for the Patras network, whereas a new line is due to be constructed for the Thessalonian network.

In Romania, the first commuter trains were introduced in December 2019. They operate between Bucharest and Funduea or Buftea.

BG Voz is an urban rail system that serves Belgrade. It currently has only two routes, with plans for further expansion. Between early 1990s and mid-2010s, there was another system, known as Beovoz, that was used to provide mass-transit service within the Belgrade metropolitan area, as well as to nearby towns, similarly to RER in Paris. Beovoz had more lines and far more stops than the current system. However, it was abandoned in favor of more accurate BG Voz, mostly due to inefficiency. While current services rely mostly on the existing infrastructure, any further development means furthering capacities (railways expansion and new trains). Plans for further extension of system include another two lines, one of which should reach Belgrade Nikola Tesla Airport.

In Russia, Ukraine and some other countries of the former Soviet Union, electrical multiple unit passenger suburban trains called Elektrichka are widespread. The first such system in Russia is the Oranienbaum Electric Line in St. Petersburg. In Moscow the Beskudnikovskaya railway branch existed between the 1940s and 1980s. The trains that shuttled along it did not go to the main lines, so it was a city transport. Today there are the Moscow Central Circle and the Moscow Central Diameters.

In Turkey, Marmaray line stations from Sirkeci to Halkalı are located at the European side. Overground section between Kazlıçeşme and Sirkeci, stations such as Cankurtaran, are closed since 2013.

Americas

North America

In the United States, Canada, Costa Rica, El Salvador and Mexico regional passenger rail services are provided by governmental or quasi-governmental agencies, with the busiest and most expansive rail networks located in the Northeastern US, California, and Eastern Canada. Most North American commuter railways utilize diesel locomotive propulsion, with the exception of services in New York City, Philadelphia, Chicago, Denver, and Mexico City; New York's commuter rail lines use a combination of third rail and overhead wire power generation, while Chicago only has two out of twelve services that are electrified. Many newer and proposed systems in Canada and the United States are often are geared to serving peak-hour commutes as opposed to the regional rail systems of Europe, East Asia, and Australia.

United States 
Eight commuter rail systems in the United States carried over ten million trips in 2018, those being in descending order:

 Metropolitan Transportation Authority's Long Island Rail Road, serving New York City and Long Island
 NJ Transit Rail Operations, serving New York City, New Jersey (Newark, Trenton) and Philadelphia
 Metropolitan Transportation Authority's Metro-North Railroad, serving New York (Yonkers and New York City) and Southwest Connecticut (New Haven)
 Metra, serving northeast Illinois (Chicago), Northern Indiana, and Kenosha, Wisconsin. The network consists of 11 services, of which only the Electric District service runs on tracks exclusively used for passenger traffic.
 SEPTA Regional Rail, serving southeast Pennsylvania (Philadelphia), as well as Wilmington, Delaware, and Trenton, New Jersey. The network features a tunneled corridor through the city center and through-routed services from several commuter lines. The arrangement of services through the corridor was originally proposed by Vukan Vuchic and Shinya Kikuchi in 1984 and 1985.
 MBTA Commuter Rail, serving Massachusetts (Boston, Worcester) and Providence, Rhode Island
 Caltrain, serving California (San Francisco, San Jose, and the San Francisco Peninsula)
 Metrolink, serving California (Los Angeles, Burbank, Anaheim, San Bernardino, and Southern California)

Other commuter rail systems in the United States (not in ridership order) are:

CTRail, serving Connecticut (Hartford, New Haven and New London)
Utah Transit Authority FrontRunner, serving Utah (Wasatch Front)
North County Transit District Coaster, serving California (San Diego County)
Maryland Area Regional Commuter, serving Maryland (Baltimore) and Washington, D.C.)
Regional Transportation District, serving Colorado (Denver)
Virginia Railway Express, serving suburbs of Northern Virginia and Washington, D.C.
Sounder commuter rail, serving Washington (Seattle / Tacoma)
Tri-Rail, serving Florida (Miami / Fort Lauderdale / West Palm Beach)
 Trinity Railway Express, serving Texas (Dallas / Fort Worth)
 Westside Express Service, serving Oregon (Beaverton / Wilsonville)
Altamont Corridor Express, serving California (San Jose / Stockton)
SunRail, serving Florida (Orlando/Poinciana)
New Mexico Rail Runner Express, serving New Mexico (Albuquerque)
Northstar Line, serving Minnesota (Big Lake and downtown Minneapolis)
Capital MetroRail, serving Texas (Austin)
A-train, serving Texas (Denton County)
SMART, serving California (Sonoma and Marin counties)
Music City Star, serving Nashville and Lebanon, Tennessee.
 Denver's RTD four electrified commuter rail lines – the A, B, G and N Lines, run on segregated tracks. In its entirety the system combines elements of tram-train and commuter rail.

Canada 

 Exo in Montreal
 GO Transit in Toronto
 West Coast Express in Vancouver
 UP Express in Toronto

Mexico 
 Suburban Railway of the Valley of Mexico Metropolitan Area serving Mexico City
 Toluca–Mexico City commuter rail serving Toluca and Mexico City

Central America
City Rail serving La Ceiba
San Salvador Suburban Rail serving San Salvador and Santa Ana
Rail Transport in Costa Rica serving San Jose

South America

Another example is Companhia Paulista de Trens Metropolitanos (CPTM) in Greater São Paulo, Brazil. Trains operates at high frequencies on tracks used exclusively for commuter traffic. In Rio de Janeiro SuperVia provides electrified commuter rail services.

Oceania

The five major cities in Australia have suburban railway systems in their metropolitan areas. These networks have frequent services, with frequencies varying from every 10 to every 30 minutes on most suburban lines, and up to 3–5 minutes in peak on bundled underground lines in the city centres of Sydney, Brisbane, Perth and Melbourne. The networks in each state developed from mainline railways and have never been completely operationally separate from long distance and freight traffic, unlike metro systems. The suburban networks are almost completely electrified.

The main suburban rail networks in Australia are:
 The Sydney Trains suburban rail network consists of nine lines converging in the underground City Circle with frequencies as high as three minutes in this section, 5–10 minutes at most major stations all day and 15 minutes at most minor stations all day.
The Sydney rail network operated by Sydney Trains in Sydney (with connected suburban services in Newcastle and Wollongong run by its counterpart intercity operator, NSW TrainLink).

 Melbourne's rail network features sixteen electrified commuter rail lines traversing the city centre in the underground City Loop providing a metro-like service in the central core. A second underground core is under construction, as the Metro Tunnel project. V/Line operates some commuter services between Melbourne and surrounding towns, as well as between Melbourne and some locations within the Melbourne metropolitan area.

 Commuter rail services in Brisbane are provided under the Queensland Rail City network brand, featuring twelve electrified lines converging in the city centre. Cross River Rail is an under construction underground cross-city tunnel to relieve pressure on this network.

 The Perth metropolitan area has the Transperth network, which has rail services operated by Transperth Train Operations

The Adelaide rail network operated by Adelaide Metro in Adelaide.

New Zealand has two frequent suburban rail services comparable to those in Australia: the Auckland rail network is operated by Auckland One Rail and the Wellington rail network is operated by Transdev Wellington.

Hybrid urban-suburban rail systems
Hybrid urban-suburban rail systems exhibiting characteristics of both rapid transit and commuter rail serving a metropolitan region are common in German-speaking countries, where they are known as S-Bahn. Other examples include the RER in France and the Elizabeth line, London Underground Metropolitan line, London Overground and Merseyrail in the UK. A comparable system in India, the Delhi RRTS, is also under construction.

See also

List of suburban and commuter rail systems
Public transport
Commuting
Cercanías, the commuter rail systems of Spain's major metropolitan areas
Commuter rail in the United Kingdom
Commuter rail in North America
Commuter rail in Australia
S-Bahn, the combined city center and suburban railway system metro in Austria, Germany, Switzerland and Denmark

References

External links 
 Commuter Rail & Transit News Current news concerning commuter rail development and issues

Commuting